Yovon (Russian and Tajik: Ёвон) is a village in Sughd Region, northern Tajikistan. It is part of the jamoat Urmetan in the Ayni District. It is located along the RB12 highway.

References

Populated places in Sughd Region